Camila Rossi (born 8 October 1999) is a Brazilian rhythmic gymnast.

She competed at the 2019 Pan American Games where she won a gold medal in the 3 hoops + 2 clubs event and bronze medals in the group all-around and 5 balls event.

References

1999 births
Living people
Brazilian rhythmic gymnasts
Pan American Games medalists in gymnastics
Pan American Games gold medalists for Brazil
Pan American Games bronze medalists for Brazil
Gymnasts at the 2019 Pan American Games
Medalists at the 2019 Pan American Games
21st-century Brazilian women